The 2019 Toronto Argonauts season was the 62nd season for the team in the Canadian Football League and their 147th season overall. The Argonauts finished with a 4–14 record, matching their win–loss record from a year prior, and did not qualify for the playoffs for the second consecutive season. 

This was the third season with Jim Popp as general manager and first for new head coach Corey Chamblin who replaced Marc Trestman following a disappointing campaign in 2018 (failing to meet expectations following a Grey Cup victory in 2017). On October 8, 2019, Popp was relieved as general manager of the team, & was replaced by Michael "Pinball" Clemons with 4 games remaining in the season. The announcement about Jim Popp being relieved of his duties came not long after the Argonauts were eliminated from playoff contention during regular season play for the second consecutive season. Their week 17 loss at BC Place against the BC Lions marked the second consecutive year the Argonauts were eliminated from playoff contention, having won only 4 games in 2018.

Offseason

Foreign drafts
For the first time in its history, the CFL held drafts for foreign players from Mexico and Europe. Like all other CFL teams, the Argonauts held three non-tradeable selections in the 2019 CFL–LFA Draft, which took place on January 14, 2019. The 2019 European CFL Draft took place on April 11, 2019 where all teams held one non-tradeable pick.

CFL draft 
The 2019 CFL Draft took place on May 2, 2019. The Argonauts had the first selection in each round of the draft by virtue of finishing last in league standings, less any traded picks. Consequently, the club selected first overall for the first time since the 1997 CFL Draft and hold nine selections in total. The Argos acquired another third-round pick from the Edmonton Eskimos after trading Martese Jackson to them. The team also acquired another seventh-round selection after trading Brian Jones to the Saskatchewan Roughriders and sent their eighth-round pick to Hamilton in exchange for Abdul Kanneh.

Preseason 
The Argonauts' home preseason game was played at the University of Toronto's Varsity Stadium with tickets being sold to students from Greater Toronto Area schools.

Schedule 

 Games played with colour uniforms.

Regular season

Standings

Schedule 
The Argonauts home opener against the Hamilton Tiger-Cats was originally slated for a 7:00pm start local time. At the request of the Hamilton Tiger-Cats' fan base, kickoff was adjusted to a 4:00pm start in lieu of a concert at 8:00pm at a nearby venue. In week 11, the Argonauts were the "home" team as they played the Montreal Alouettes in the fourth regular season installment of Touchdown Atlantic in Moncton, New Brunswick.

 Games played with colour uniforms.
 Games played with white uniforms.

Team

Roster

Coaching staff

References

External links
 

Toronto Argonauts seasons
2019 Canadian Football League season by team
2019 in Toronto